Berezovka is a rural locality (a selo) and the administrative center of Berezovsky Rural Okrug in Srednekolymsky District of the Sakha Republic, Russia, located  from Srednekolymsk, the administrative center of the district. Its population as of the 2010 Census was 330; up from 316 recorded in the 2002 Census.

References

Notes

Sources
Official website of the Sakha Republic. Registry of the Administrative-Territorial Divisions of the Sakha Republic. Srednekolymsky District. 

Rural localities in Srednekolymsky District